Cornufer latro is a species of frog in the family Ceratobatrachidae endemic to Papua New Guinea. It has been observed in the Admiralty Archipelago on the Pak, Rambutyo, Manus and Los Negros Islands.

Original description

References

Frogs of Asia
Amphibians described in 2008
Endemic fauna of Papua New Guinea
latro